Coons may refer to:

People
 Albert Coons (1912–1978), American physician, pathologist, and immunologist
 Asa Coons (1993-2007), gunman in the SuccessTech Academy shooting
 Carleton S. Coon (1904–1981), American physical anthropologist
 Chris Coons (born 1963), American politician; U.S. Senator for Delaware
 Dana Coons (born 1978), American long-distance runner
 David Coons (born 1960), computer graphics specialist
 Gary Coons (born 1951), Canadian politician
 Maurice Coons (1908-1930), the given name of author Armitage Trail (1908-1930)
 Steven Anson Coons (1912-1979), early pioneer in the field of computer graphical methods

Mathematics
 Coons patch, surface patch used in computer graphics

Other meanings
 Coons! Night of the Bandits of the Night, a 2005 film

See also 
 Coon (disambiguation)
 Koons (disambiguation)